The Cape Colony, also known as the Cape of Good Hope, was a British colony in present-day South Africa named after the Cape of Good Hope. It existed from 1795 to 1802, and again from 1806 to 1910, when it united with three other colonies to form the Union of South Africa.

The British colony was preceded by an earlier corporate colony that became an original Dutch colony of the same name, which was established in 1652 by the Dutch East India Company (VOC). The Cape was under VOC rule from 1652 to 1795 and under rule of the Napoleonic Batavia Republic from 1803 to 1806.  The VOC lost the colony to Great Britain following the 1795 Battle of Muizenberg, but it was acceded to the Batavia Republic following the 1802 Treaty of Amiens. It was re-occupied by the British following the Battle of Blaauwberg in 1806, and British possession affirmed with the Anglo-Dutch Treaty of 1814. The Cape of Good Hope then remained in the British Empire, becoming self-governing in 1872.

The colony was coextensive with the later Cape Province, stretching from the Atlantic coast inland and eastward along the southern coast, constituting about half of modern South Africa: the final eastern boundary, after several wars against the Xhosa, stood at the Fish River. From 1878, the colony also included the enclave of Walvis Bay and the Penguin Islands, both in what is now Namibia.

It united with three other colonies to form the Union of South Africa in 1910, and was accordingly renamed the Province of the Cape of Good Hope. South Africa became a sovereign state in 1931 by the Statute of Westminster. In 1961, it became the Republic of South Africa. Following the 1994 creation of the present-day South African provinces, the Cape Province was partitioned into the Eastern Cape, Northern Cape, and Western Cape, with smaller parts in North West province.

History

VOC settlement

An expedition of the VOC led by Jan van Riebeeck established a trading post and naval victualing station at the Cape of Good Hope in 1652. Van Riebeeck's objective was to secure a harbour of refuge for VOC ships during the long voyages between Europe and Asia. Reflecting the multi-national nature of the early trading companies, the VOC granted  status to Dutch, Scandinavian and German employees, among others. In 1688 they also sponsored the immigration of nearly two hundred French Huguenot refugees who had fled to the Netherlands upon the Edict of Fontainebleau. This so-called "Huguenot experiment" was deemed a failure by the colonial authorities a decade later, as many of the Huguenot arrivals had little experience with agriculture and had become a net burden on the colonial government. There was a degree of cultural assimilation due to Dutch cultural hegemony that included the almost universal adoption of the Dutch language.

Many of the colonists who settled directly on the frontier became increasingly independent and localised in their loyalties. Known as Boers, they migrated westwards beyond the Cape Colony's initial borders and had soon penetrated almost a thousand kilometres inland. The VOC colonial period had a number of bitter, genocidal conflicts between the colonists and the Khoe-speaking indigenes, followed by the Xhosa, both of which they perceived as unwanted competitors for prime farmland.

VOC traders imported thousands of slaves to the Cape of Good Hope from the Dutch East Indies and other parts of Africa. By the end of the eighteenth century the Cape's population swelled to about 26,000 people of European descent and 30,000 slaves.

British conquest

In 1795, France occupied the Seven Provinces of the Dutch Republic, the mother country of the Dutch United East India Company. This prompted Great Britain to occupy the Cape Colony in 1795 as a way to better control the seas in order to stop any potential French attempt to reach India. The British sent a fleet of nine warships which anchored at Simon's Town and, following the defeat of the VOC militia at the Battle of Muizenberg, took control of the territory. The United East India Company transferred its territories and claims to the Batavian Republic (the Revolutionary period Dutch state) in 1798, and went bankrupt in 1799. Improving relations between Britain and Napoleonic France, and its vassal state the Batavian Republic, led the British to hand the Cape of Good Hope over to the Batavian Republic in 1803, under the terms of the Treaty of Amiens.

In 1806, the Cape, now nominally controlled by the Batavian Republic, was occupied again by the British after their victory in the Battle of Blaauwberg. The temporary peace between the UK and Napoleonic France had crumbled into open hostilities, whilst Napoleon had been strengthening his influence on the Batavian Republic (which Napoleon would subsequently abolish and directly administer later the same year). The British, who set up a colony on 8 January 1806, hoped to keep Napoleon out of the Cape, and to control the Far East trade routes.

The Cape Colony at the time of British occupation was three months' sailing distance from London. The White colonial population was small, no more than 25,000 in all, scattered across a territory of 100,000 square miles. Most lived in Cape Town and the surrounding farming districts of the Boland, an area favoured with rich soils, a Mediterranean Climate and reliable rainfall. Cape Town had a population of 16,000 people.  
In 1814 the Dutch government formally ceded sovereignty over the Cape to the British, under the terms of the Convention of London.

British colonisation
The British started to settle the eastern border of the cape colony, with the arrival in Port Elizabeth of the 1820 Settlers. They also began to introduce the first rudimentary rights for the Cape's Black African population and, in 1834, abolished slavery; however, the government proved unable to rein in settler violence against the San, which continued largely unabated as it had during the Dutch period. The resentment that the Boers felt against this social change, as well as the imposition of English language and culture, caused them to trek inland en masse. This was known as the Great Trek, and the migrating Boers settled inland, eventually forming the Boer Republics.

British Immigration continued in the Cape, even as many of the Boers continued to trek inland, and the ending of the British East India Company's monopoly on trade led to economic growth.

At the same time, the long series of Xhosa Wars fought between the Xhosa people in the east and the government of the Cape Colony as well as Boer settlers finally died down when the Xhosa took part in a mass destruction of their own crops and cattle, in the belief that this would cause their ancestors to wake from the dead. The resulting famine crippled Xhosa country and ushered in a long period of stability on the border.

Peace and prosperity led to a desire for political independence. In 1853, the Cape Colony became a British Crown colony with representative government. In 1854, the Cape of Good Hope elected its first parliament, on the basis of the multi-racial Cape Qualified Franchise. Cape residents qualified as voters based on a universal minimum level of property ownership, regardless of race.

Executive power remaining completely in the authority of the British governor did not relieve tensions in the colony between its eastern and western sections.

Responsible government
In 1872, after a long political battle, the Cape of Good Hope achieved responsible government under its first Prime Minister, John Molteno. Henceforth, an elected Prime Minister and his cabinet had total responsibility for the affairs of the country. A period of strong economic growth and social development ensued, and the eastern-western division was largely laid to rest. The system of multi-racial franchise also began a slow and fragile growth in political inclusiveness, and ethnic tensions subsided. In 1877, the state expanded by annexing Griqualand West and Griqualand East – that is, the Mount Currie district (Kokstad). The emergence of two Boer mini-republics along the Missionary Road resulted in 1885 in the Warren Expedition, sent to annex the republics of Stellaland and Goshen (lands annexed to British Bechuanaland). Major-General Charles Warren annexed the land south of the Molopo River as the colony of British Bechuanaland and proclaimed a protectorate over the land lying to the North of the river. Vryburg, the capital of Stellaland, became capital of British Bechuanaland, while Mafeking (now Mahikeng), although situated south of the protectorate border, became the protectorate's administrative centre. The border between the protectorate and the colony ran along the Molopo and Nossob rivers. In 1895 British Bechuanaland became part of the Cape Colony.

However, the discovery of diamonds around Kimberley and gold in the Transvaal led to a return to instability, particularly because they fuelled the rise to power of the ambitious imperialist Cecil Rhodes. On becoming the Cape's Prime Minister in 1890, he instigated a rapid expansion of British influence into the hinterland. In particular, he sought to engineer the conquest of the Transvaal, and although his ill-fated Jameson Raid failed and brought down his government, it led to the Second Boer War and British conquest at the turn of the century. The politics of the colony consequently came to be increasingly dominated by tensions between the British colonists and the Boers. Rhodes also brought in the first formal restrictions on the political rights of the Cape of Good Hope's black African citizens.

The Cape of Good Hope remained nominally under British rule until the formation of the Union of South Africa in 1910, when it became the Province of the Cape of Good Hope, better known as the Cape Province.

Governors

Districts 

The districts of the colony in 1850 were:
 Clanwilliam
 The Cape
 Stellenbosch
 Zwellendam
 Tulbagh/Worcester
 Beaufort
 George
 Uitenhague
 Albany
 Victoria
 Somerset
 Graaf Reynet
 Colesberg

Demographics
Population figures for the 1865, 1875, 1891 and 1904 censuses. Groups marked "nd" are Not Distinguished in the censuses for those years.

See also

 Parliament of the Cape of Good Hope
 Cape Colonial Forces
 Cape Government Railways
 Cape Qualified Franchise

References

Notes

Citations

Sources

 

<

Further reading

 Beck, Roger B. (2000). The History of South Africa. Westport, CT: Greenwood. 
 Davenport, T. R. H., and Christopher Saunders (2000). South Africa: A Modern History, 5th ed. New York: St. Martin's Press. .
 Elbourne, Elizabeth (2002). Blood Ground: Colonialism, Missions, and the Contest for Christianity in the Cape Colony and Britain, 1799–1853. McGill-Queen's University Press. 
 Le Cordeur, Basil Alexander (1981). The War of the Axe, 1847: Correspondence between the governor of the Cape Colony, Sir Henry Pottinger, and the commander of the British forces at the Cape, Sire George Berkeley, and others. Brenthurst Press. 
 Mabin, Alan (1983). Recession and its aftermath: The Cape Colony in the eighteen eighties. University of the Witwatersrand, African Studies Institute.
 Ross, Robert, and David Anderson (1999). Status and Respectability in the Cape Colony, 1750–1870 : A Tragedy of Manners. Cambridge University Press. .
 Theal, George McCall (1970). History of the Boers in South Africa; Or, the Wanderings and Wars of the Emigrant Farmers from Their Leaving the Cape Colony to the Acknowledgment of Their Independence by Great Britain. Greenwood Press. .
 Van Der Merwe, P.J., Roger B. Beck (1995). The Migrant Farmer in the History of the Cape Colony. Ohio University Press. 
 

 
1795 establishments in Africa
1910 disestablishments in South Africa
British Empire
Former British colonies and protectorates in Africa
History of South Africa
States and territories disestablished in 1802
States and territories disestablished in 1910
States and territories established in 1795
States and territories established in 1806